Frundsberg may refer to:
SMS Frundsberg, an Austro-Hungarian corvette
10th SS Panzer Division Frundsberg

People with the surname
Georg von Frundsberg